West Blean and Thornden Woods is a  biological Site of Special Scientific Interest north of Canterbury in Kent. The woods form one of the largest areas of ancient woodland in the UK, with parts of it over 1,000 years old.

These woods have more than fifty species of breeding birds, and the diverse invertebrate fauna include five nationally rare and thirteen nationally scarce species. There is also a population of the declining and protected hazel dormouse.

In July 2022, as part of the Wilder Blean project, European bison were released in to West Blean and Thornden Woods. The reintroduction to the UK in 2022, the first time in 6000 years (apart from an unsuccessful project in Scotland in 2011), will consist of a herd of 3 females and 1 male. The bisons’ natural behaviour is expected to transform an area of  former commercial pine forest into a natural woodland. Exmoor ponies, iron age pigs and Longhorn cattle are also to be released into the woods.

There is access to the nature reserve but some areas are private land.

References

Kent Wildlife Trust
Sites of Special Scientific Interest in Kent
Forests and woodlands of Kent